Puru refer to: 
Puru (Vedic tribe), a tribe, or a confederation of tribes, mentioned many times in the Rigveda
King Puru, a Hindu king in the Rigveda and Mahabharata
King Porus, a king of northwest India in the time of Alexander the Great
Puru (artist) (1896-1963), also known as Pu Xinyu, artist and cousin of China's last emperor Puyi
Puru, Estonia, a village in Estonia

See also
Puru and Yadu Dynasties